Stanislav Sajdok (born 22 July 1983 in Bratislava, Czechoslovakia) is a Czech sprint hurdler. He set a personal best time of 13.53 seconds at the 2008 Ostrava Golden Spike in Ostrava, earning him a spot on the Czech track and field team for the Olympics.

Sajdok represented the Czech Republic at the 2008 Summer Olympics in Beijing, where he competed for the men's 110 m hurdles, an event which was later dominated by Cuban athlete and world-record holder Dayron Robles. He ran in the fourth heat against seven other athletes, including United States' David Payne and France's Ladji Doucouré, both of whom were heavy favorites in this event. He finished the race in sixth place by three hundredths of a second (0.03) behind Belarus' Maksim Lynsha, with a time of 13.89 seconds. Sajdok, however, failed to advance into the semi-finals, as he placed thirty-fourth overall, and was ranked below four mandatory slots for the next round.

References

External links

Profile – Czech Athletics Federation 
NBC 2008 Olympics profile

Czech male hurdlers
Living people
Olympic athletes of the Czech Republic
Athletes (track and field) at the 2008 Summer Olympics
Sportspeople from Bratislava
1983 births